The International Committee on Anthropogenic Soils (ICOMANTH) defines its mission as follows. "ICOMANTH is charged with defining appropriate classes in soil taxonomy for soils  that have their major properties derived from human activities. The committee should establish which criteria significantly reflect human activities, or when a soil's properties are dominantly the result of human activities."

See also
FAO soil classification
Soil classification
Soil structure
USDA soil taxonomy

External links
ICOMANTH home page

Land management
Environmental soil science
Pedology